The 2004 Cyprus Rally (formally the 32nd Cyprus Rally) was the fifth round of the 2004 World Rally Championship. The race was held over three days between 14 May and 16 May 2004, and was based in Limassol, Cyprus. Citroën's Sébastien Loeb won the race, his 7th win in the World Rally Championship.

Background

Entry list

Itinerary
All dates and times are EEST (UTC+3).

Results

Overall

World Rally Cars

Classification

Special stages

Championship standings

References

External links 

 Official website of the World Rally Championship
 2004 Cyprus Rally at Rallye-info 

Cyprus
Cyprus Rally
2004 in Cypriot sport